Zuurbekom is a town in the Gauteng province, South Africa. It is mainly earmarked for agricultural purposes.

References

Populated places in the Rand West City Local Municipality